HK Riga is an ice hockey club, based in Riga, Latvia. It was founded in 2009 to serve as the farm club of former Kontinental Hockey League club Dinamo Riga. The club played the 2009–10 season in both the Latvian Hockey Higher League (which they won) and the Belarusian Extraleague, but joined the Russian Junior Hockey League (MHL), the junior league of the Kontinental Hockey League, for the 2010–11 season.

References

External links
  

2009 establishments in Latvia
HK Riga
Ice hockey clubs established in 2009
Ice hockey teams in Latvia
Junior Hockey League (Russia) teams